An election to Dublin County Council took place on 27 June 1991 as part of that year's Irish local elections. Councillors were elected from local electoral areas on the system of proportional representation by means of the single transferable vote for a six-year term of office. It was the last election held for Dublin County Council.

The election took place in three electoral counties:
 Dún Laoghaire–Rathdown
 Fingal
 South Dublin

From 1 January 1994, on the coming into effect of the Local Government (Dublin) Act 1993, County Dublin was disestablished as an administrative county, and in its place, the electoral counties became three new counties: Dún Laoghaire–Rathdown, Fingal and South Dublin. From that date, councillors elected for the electoral counties of Dublin County Council became councillors of the respective county councils:
 Dún Laoghaire–Rathdown County Council
 Fingal County Council
 South Dublin County Council

References

1991 Irish local elections
1991